Terror Squad Productions is an American Hip hop and Rap record company founded by Fat Joe in 1997. The label had been distributed by Atlantic, EMI, and Imperial, E1 (formerly Koch). The label's flagship artist was Big Pun.

History

Early Years (1997-1999)
Fat Joe decided to form Terror Squad Productions in 1997 with help from Craig Kallman, Greg Angelides, and his manager Mick Bentson.

After being disappointed with the previous album sales at Relativity Records, Fat Joe left Relativity and signed to Atlantic Records. After signing to Atlantic, Fat Joe was granted his own record label, Terror Squad Productions. Atlantic would allow Fat Joe to sign artists to Terror Squad. Under the terms of the deal, Fat Joe was responsible for putting their albums together and they would fund, promote and distribute the releases from the label. In addition to himself, Fat Joe also signed the rap group Terror Squad and its members Armageddon, Prospect, Triple Seis, Cuban Link, and Big Pun. The label's first release was Big Pun's debut album Capital Punishment which was released on April 28, 1998. It was executive produced by both Fat Joe and Big Pun and featured guest appearances from Prospect, Armageddon, Triple Seis, Cuban Link and Fat Joe. The album peaked at number 5 on the Billboard top 200 and was certified Platinum by the RIAA. The label's second release was Fat Joe's Don Cartagena, which was released September 1, 1998. The album was executive produced by Fat Joe and featured guest appearances from Big Pun and the Terror Squad. It peaked at number 7 on the Billboard 200 chart and was certified Gold by the RIAA. 

Don Cartagena introduced the rap group Terror Squad, and Terror Squad released their debut album The Album on September 21, 1999. Terror Squad artist Armageddon contributed production to the album. The album sold 250,000 units to date. Although not commercially successful, it was critically successful and was meant to be the foundation for other members to release their own albums.

2000-2005 
On February 7, 2000, Big Pun died of a heart attack, and his album Yeeeah Baby was released posthumously that year on April 4. The album debuted and peaked at number 3 on the Billboard Top 200. The album featured guest appearances from Prospect, Cuban Link, Fat Joe and Tony Sunshine. Remy Ma (then known as Remy Martin), who was Big Pun's protege, made her debut appearance on the album. In October 2017, the album was certified Platinum in America. Shortly after Big Pun's death, Triple Seis left Terror Squad Productions and parted ways with the Terror Squad group. Cuban Link would follow suit shortly thereafter after his long-awaited debut studio album that was scheduled for a summer 2000 release, 24K, was shelved due to bootlegging, problems with Atlantic Records, and issues with Fat Joe.

On December 4, 2001, Fat Joe released his fourth studio album Jealous Ones Still Envy (J.O.S.E.) through Terror Squad Productions. It featured the hit singles "We Thuggin'" and "What's Luv", and featured guest appearances from Armageddon (who co-executive produced the album along with Fat Joe), Prospect, and Remy Ma. The following year in 2002, Fat Joe released Loyalty. The album was a commercial disappointment, only peaking at number 31 on the Billboard 200 and failing to achieve a RIAA certification. In 2004, Terror Squad released its second and final studio album True Story through Steve Rifkind's SRC Records, Universal Records and Terror Squad Entertainment. The album peaked at number 7 on the Billboard 200. Though Prospect, Tony Sunshine, and Armageddon had made guest appearances on Fat Joe's albums and Terror Squad albums, they never released solo debut studio albums, and they all left by 2006.

In 2005, Fat Joe released All or Nothing. The album did better than his previous album but was still a commercial failure, and it was Fat Joe's final album on Atlantic Records

Later years & Signing of DJ Khaled (2005-present)
In September 2006, Fat Joe finalized a distribution deal for Terror Squad through Imperial Records and EMI. "Make It Rain" featuring Lil Wayne was the debut single for Fat Joe's Me Myself & I. The label also released the debut album from DJ Khaled & PRO's Super Produced Listennn... the Album that year on Koch. The label followed the success of these two albums into 2007, which led to the 2nd album from DJ Khaled We The Best which featured the hit single "We Takin' Over", which had guest appearances from Akon, T.I., Rick Ross, Fat Joe, Baby, and Lil Wayne.

Discography
 1998: Big Pun - Capital Punishment
 1998: Fat Joe - Don Cartagena
 1999: Terror Squad - The Album
 2000: Big Pun - Yeeeah Baby
 2001: Fat Joe - Jealous Ones Still Envy
 2002: Fat Joe - Loyalty
 2004: Terror Squad - True Story
 2005: Fat Joe - All or Nothing
 2006: Remy Ma - There's Something About Remy: Based on a True Story
 2006: DJ Khaled - Listennn...the Album
 2006: Fat Joe - Me, Myself & I 
 2007: DJ Khaled - We The Best
 2008: Fat Joe - The Elephant in the Room
 2008: DJ Khaled - We Global
 2009: Fat Joe - Jealous Ones Still Envy 2
 2010: Fat Joe - The Darkside Vol. 1
 2011: Fat Joe - The Darkside Vol. 2
 2013: Fat Joe - The Darkside Vol. 3

Artists
 Fat Joe
 Big Pun  (Deceased)
 Cuban Link 
 Tony Sunshine  
 Prospect
 Armageddon
 Triple Seis
 Denzil Porter
 Remy Ma
 Cool & Dre
 Eddie House - **Management Only
 RySoValid
 Torch_(American_rapper) w/ Maybach Music Group
 Drag On w/ Hood Environment Full Surface
St. Raw w/ Arliss Network & D-Block & Ruff Ryder Records

References

American record labels
1997 establishments in New York City
Record labels established in 1997
EMI
Companies based in the Bronx